Morrinsville is a provincial town in the Waikato region of New Zealand's North Island, with an estimated population of  as of  The town is located at the northern base of the Pakaroa Range, and on the south-western fringe of the Hauraki Plains.  Morrinsville is around 33 kilometres east of Hamilton and 22 kilometres west of Te Aroha. The town is bordered by the Piako River to the east and the Waitakaruru Stream to the south.

History and Culture

Pre-European settlement

Prior to European settlement of New Zealand, the hills around present-day Morrinsville were occupied  by the Ngati Werewere Māori people of the Ngati Haua Iwi, and the site of the present-day town was on or near to an old Māori route between the upper Waihou-Piako basin and the Ngāruawāhia area.

Following European settlement, some early European traders are believed to have traversed this route prior to 1834 when the Rev. J. Morgan travelled up the Piako River to near the future town site and crossed west to Horotiu, near Ngāruawāhia. First recorded contact with European settlers occurred around 1850, with John Johnson trading with the Māori from 1852.

Post-European settlement

The 1860s saw an influx of European settlers to the area between Te Aroha and Matamata, and on 13 December 1873 a settler from Auckland, Thomas  Morrin, purchased the Kuranui No.1 Block from the local Māori and founded the Lockerbie Estate, which Morrin named after the Scottish town from which his father had emigrated. The fledgling village was to be the service centre for Morrin's Lockerbie Estate and he built a blacksmith's shop, manager's house, the Jolly Cripple Hotel and general store and donated land for a school. Morrin hired Irish navvies from the gold fields to dig a network of ditches to drain the land, enabling it to be used for agriculture. In 1882 Morrin surveyed the land for the site of the town proper, and deposited plans for ten streets:  Anderson, Hamilton, Studholme, Moorhouse, Lorne, Canada, Cureton, Somerville, Thames and Thorpe (the first and last three streets being named after family members).

The Thames Valley and Rotorua Railway Company began construction of a railway line from Morrinsville to Rotorua in 1879, and on 1 October 1884, the line from Hamilton to Morrinsville was opened. With construction progressing towards Paeroa and the line to Te Aroha opening on 1 March 1886, the town's population was listed as 633 people. With further expansion of the railway towards Thames and Tauranga, alongside extensive drainage of swamp land to the south and west of the town making available large areas for dairy farming, Morrinsville was declared a town district in 1908 and in 1921 was constituted as a borough.

Marae

Morrinsville has two marae: Kai a Te Mata and its meeting house Wairere, and Rukumoana or Top Pā and its meeting house Werewere. Both marae are affiliated with the Ngāti Hauā iwi and its Ngāti Werewere hapū, and with the Waikato Tainui iwi.

In October 2020, the Government committed $734,311 from the Provincial Growth Fund to upgrade both marae and 3 other Ngāti Hauā marae, creating 7 jobs.

Demographics 

Morrinsville had a population of 7,761 at the 2018 New Zealand census, an increase of 768 people (11.0%) since the 2013 census, and an increase of 1,158 people (17.5%) since the 2006 census. There were 2,934 households, comprising 3,699 males and 4,062 females, giving a sex ratio of 0.91 males per female, with 1,533 people (19.8%) aged under 15 years, 1,467 (18.9%) aged 15 to 29, 3,138 (40.4%) aged 30 to 64, and 1,626 (21.0%) aged 65 or older.

Ethnicities were 83.4% European/Pākehā, 18.1% Māori, 1.9% Pacific peoples, 6.9% Asian, and 1.4% other ethnicities. People may identify with more than one ethnicity.

The percentage of people born overseas was 12.7, compared with 27.1% nationally.

Although some people chose not to answer the census's question about religious affiliation, 52.6% had no religion, 34.5% were Christian, 0.9% had Māori religious beliefs, 0.9% were Hindu, 0.3% were Muslim, 1.5% were Buddhist and 2.2% had other religions.

Of those at least 15 years old, 747 (12.0%) people had a bachelor's or higher degree, and 1,737 (27.9%) people had no formal qualifications. 924 people (14.8%) earned over $70,000 compared to 17.2% nationally. The employment status of those at least 15 was that 3,027 (48.6%) people were employed full-time, 807 (13.0%) were part-time, and 198 (3.2%) were unemployed.

The Morrinsville East and West areas had these census figures -

Apart from Morrinsville, the largest number of commuters go to Waihou from Morrinsville East and Tahuroa from West. In 2018 13.8% of the population of Morrinsville East and 25.1% of West were Māori.

Education

All these schools are co-educational. Rolls are as of

Commerce

Morrinsville is one of three towns, along with Te Aroha and Matamata, that serves one of New Zealand's most prosperous dairy farming areas.

Dairy processing has been a notable industry in Morrinsville, most notably through the Morrinsville Dairy Company since 1922.  The dairy company retained the Scottish link through prominently using the name Lockerbie. Today, after a series of mergers, the dairy factory is now operated by the Fonterra Dairy Co-operative. The factory processes 1.2 million litres of milk per day during the peak of the milk production season, producing milk powders, cream, butter and canned butter for tropical countries where refrigeration is not always available.

During the late 1920s a company was formed to develop the flax industry on the extensive low-lying areas west of Morrinsville. Several thousand acres were acquired for the planting and milling of New Zealand flax (Phormium tenax), but prevailing  economic conditions forced the early abandonment of the project.  Most of this land has reverted to dairy farming or fat-lamb production, and the original English grasses used by earlier settlers have been replaced with higher producing Italian ryegrass and nitrogen-fixing white clover. During the town's formative years the area also contained a number of commercial sawmills, most of which closed by the 1930s as land was cleared for farming. Meadow Mushrooms, one of Morrinsville's biggest employers, ceased its local operations and relocated to Canterbury in 2010, with the subsequent loss of around 160 jobs.

As a service centre for the local dairy industry, many of Morrinsville's businesses are geared towards supporting this industry and associated rural activities, and today the town is still home to large stockyards and regular livestock markets.  There is also a chemical plant producing hydrogen peroxide, fertiliser and other agri-nutrients located on the southern outskirts of the town.

Transportation

Railway

Historically, Morrinsville was the railway junction of the Auckland–Thames and Auckland–Rotorua lines, which subsequently became the Thames Branch and the East Coast Main Trunk Railway (Tauranga) lines.  Morrinsville Railway Station was opened on 1 October 1884, to the east off Studholme Street, at the junction of the two lines. A footbridge over the track was opened in 1913, connecting the station with the town from the end of Canada Street. The station was described as consisting of "two asphalt passenger platforms, and the station buildings contain a ladies' waiting room, a large general waiting room, a post office lobby with post and telegraph offices, a ticket office, and offices for the Inspector of Permanent Way. There are also large goods and engine sheds, and cattle loading yards. Five workmen's cottages adjoin the station, and the Bank of New Zealand Estates Company has a large building connected with the siding for seed-cleaning and storage purposes." The station was moved about  towards Hamilton in 1923. The original station building was demolished in 1984 and a smaller building was erected approximately 300 metres to the west off Marshall Street, which is still used by KiwiRail for freight services.

Passenger services are no longer provided to or from Morrinsville Railway Station.  The Thames Branch closed on 28 June 1991 and the track subsequently lifted, although in 2004 a short shunt line – the Waitoa Industrial Line – reopened to facilitate freight trains for the Waitoa Dairy Factory. The East Coast Main Trunk Railway provided passenger services between Auckland and Rotorua – the Geyserland Express – and Auckland and Tauranga - the Kaimai Express; however, in 2001 it was announced that these services were too uneconomic to continue, and the last trains ran on 7 October 2001.

Passenger traffic reached a peak in 1944, as shown in this table and the graph -

Road network
Morrinsville is located on State Highway 26 (SH26), running from Hamilton in the west to the Firth of Thames and the Coromandel Peninsula via Mangatarata in the north east. From the town centre it is approximately 7.5 km to the junction of State Highway 27 (SH27) in the east, providing access to the provincial town of Matamata to the south.

Public transport

Buses
A Rotorua to Auckland bus runs via Morrinsville once a day each way, provided by InterCity, but a service between Hamilton and Coromandel via Paeroa ended in 2017, and those by nakedbus, which ran daily between Hamilton and Whitianga in 2018.

Local bus services to Morrinsville are provided by the Waikato Regional Council with a daily service (#22) between Hamilton and Paeroa via Te Aroha.

Walkways 
A  walkway runs beside Waitakaruru Stream and one of  beside the Piako River. There are also shorter walkways on the north east edge of town.

Sports clubs
 Kereone Rugby & Sports Club, established in 1919.
 Morrinsville Sports

Notable people

 Stephen Allen (1882–1964), mayor of Morrinsville
 Constable Edward Best (1899–1941), born in nearby Annandale
 John Money (1921–2006), psychologist and author known for his research in gender identity
 Hemi Taylor (born 1963), former Wales rugby union player
 Jacinda Ardern (born 1980), former Prime Minister of New Zealand and leader of the Labour Party

References

External links
Official Website of Morrinsville and i-SITE Visitor Information Centre
Waikato Regional Council
Matamata-Piako District Council
1951 photo of railway station

 
Populated places in Waikato